Garty is a surname. Notable people with the surname include:

John Garty (1864–1897), New Zealand cricketer
Netta Garty (born 1980), Israeli actress

See also
Gary (given name)
McGarty